Amargosa is a municipality in the state of Bahia in the North-East region of Brazil.

Banks 
The city currently has three banking branches: Banco do Brasil, Caixa Econômica, and Bradesco. There are also two lottery shops and a post office.

See also
List of municipalities in Bahia

Gallery

References

Municipalities in Bahia